Our Lady of Palmar, known formally as Our Crowned Mother of Palmar, is a Palmarian Christian title of the Blessed Virgin Mary associated with an alleged Marian apparition in the Spanish village of El Palmar de Troya in 1968. The apparition is not recognized by the Roman Catholic Church but is recognized by the Palmarian Christian Church, a schismatic Independent Catholic denomination. The Cathedral-Basilica of Our Crowned Mother of Palmar, the mother church of the Palmarian Christian Church, serves as the major shrine of Our Lady of Palmar and was built on the site of the alleged apparition.

Marian apparition 

On 30 March 1968 four school girls from El Palmar de Troya reported having apparitions of "a very beautiful lady" on a tree near the Alcaparrosa field, just outside of the town in Spanish Andalusia, while they were picking flowers. In the following year, several other people reported apparitions and visions of the Virgin Mary in the field. The alleged apparitions attracted large groups of Roman Catholics to the region from other parts of Spain and abroad. Visionaries reported messages from the Virgin Mary, claiming she instructed people to pray the Our Father and the rosary, and for Catholics to return to worship in the Traditional form.

On 15 October 1968 Clemente Domínguez y Gómez and Manuel Corral visited the apparition site for the very first time. On 30 September 1969 Domínguez y Gómez claimed to have a vision of Jesus Christ and Saint Padre Pio of Pietrelcina. Later that year, on the eighth and fifteenth of December, he claimed to have visions of the Blessed Virgin Mary. He also claimed to experience stigmata and other Holy Wounds. According to Domínguez y Gómez, the Virgin Mary and Jesus Christ both communicated to him that the Tridentine Mass was the only correct form of Mass and that the Mass of Paul VI was blasphemy. There were also warnings that Freemasons and Communists were infiltrating the Catholic Church. Domínguez y Gómez went on to claim that Pope Paul VI was innocent, and that he was a victim of other Catholic leaders, who were holding him hostage in the Vatican.

On 18 May 1970 Cardinal José Bueno y Monreal, the Roman Catholic Archbishop of Seville formally denounced the apparitions as "collective and superstitious hysteria". The apparition site continued to attract Roman Catholic pilgrims and so, on 18 March 1972, Cardinal Bueno y Monreal reiterated his denunciation of the apparition and visions, forbidding Catholic devotion to Our Lady of Palmar. Under his ruling, no Roman Catholic priests were allowed to make pilgrimages to El Palmar de Troya, and no acts of public worship or religious services were allowed to take place.

On 30 November 1975 Domínguez y Gómez claimed to have a vision of the Virgin Mary and Christ announcing the foundation of a new religious order to reform the Church. In 1975 they founded a canonically irregular religious order, the Christian Palmarian Church of the Carmelites of the Holy Face. The order was denounced by the Archbishop of Seville who refused to ordain any priests or consecrate any religious sisters and brothers to the order. Archbishop Ngô Đình Thục ordained Domínguez y Gómez, Alonso, and two other men to the priesthood, and consecrated Domínguez y Gómez and others as bishops, granting the order Apostolic succession. The papal nuncio to Spain, Luigi Dadaglio, declared Archbishop Thuc, Domínguez y Gómez, and all Palmaranian bishops excommunicated from the Catholic Church. The Sacred Congregation for the Doctrine of the Faith in Rome declared all clergy of the order suspended ipso iure.

In 1976 Domínguez y Gómez claimed to have received a private apparition from the Virgin Mary asking him to consecrate more bishops to the religious order. He also claimed to have been given messages from the Virgin Mary that Pope Paul VI would be succeeded by a valid pope and by an antipope, and that the Catholic Church would no longer be centered in Rome. After the death of Pope Paul VI on 6 August 1978, Domínguez y Gómez claimed to have been crowned by Christ as the new Pope of the Catholic Church, taking the papal name Gregory XVII and declaring that the Holy See had been transferred from Rome to El Palmar de Troya. At this time the order formed into its own Independent Catholic church, called the Palmarian Christian Church, and severed all ties with the Catholic Church. Domínguez y Gómez claimed to continue to have visions and witness apparitions of the Virgin Mary until 2000.

Marian shrine 

In 1974 Domínguez y Gómez and Corral purchased the Alcaparrosa field and built an elaborate shrine dedicated to the Virgin Mary, surrounded by a wall. In 1978 construction began to build a larger church on the site. The shrine, known as the Cathedral-Basilica of Our Crowned Mother of Palmar, was finished in 2014 and is used as the cathedral and headquarters of the Palmarian Christian Church.

References

External links
 The apparitions of the Virgin Mary in El Palmar de Troya

1968 in Andalusia
Catholicism in Spain
Conclavism
Marian apparitions
Titles of Mary
Traditionalist Catholicism
Province of Seville
Visions of Jesus and Mary